The Kremmener Luch is a shallow fen, known locally as a luch, between the Glien plateau (near Berlin) in the south, and the Beetzer Heath in the north. The western Rhin flows through the Kremmener Luch, where it is called the Kremmener Rhin, or the Ruppiner Canal.

The Kremmen Lake, which is embedded in the Kremmener Luch, was converted into a nature preserve in 1924. This wildlife preserve is 11 square kilometres large today, and there can one can still see cranes, beavers, and European otters. For 300 years the Kremmener Luch has been drying up, and today, the greater part of it is suitable for agricultural usage, and has thus lost its moorish character.

The Kremmer Dam, scene of the decisive battle which established the Hohenzollerns as rulers of Brandenburg, goes through the Luch, the only road connection to the north, though the Kremmen-Neurippin railway line also provides access to the north.

Wetlands of Germany
Havelland
Landforms of Brandenburg